Amagansett  is a census-designated place that roughly corresponds to the hamlet by the same name in the Town of East Hampton in Suffolk County, New York, United States, on the South Shore of Long Island. As of the 2010 United States Census, the CDP population was 1,165. Amagansett hamlet was founded in 1680.

History

Amagansett derives its name from the Montaukett name for "place of good water" from a water source near what today is Indian Wells beach.

Unlike the rest of the Hamptons, Amagansett was initially settled by the Baker, Conklin, and Barnes families, descendants of English settlers, and the Dutch brothers Abraham and Jacob Schellinger, the sons of a New Amsterdam merchant who moved to East Hampton between 1680 and 1690 after the English took over New Amsterdam.

During Operation Pastorius, a failed Nazi attack on the United States staged in June 1942, during World War II, four German spies were dropped off from a submarine on Atlantic Avenue beach in Amagansett, where they made their way to the village's Long Island Rail Road station and boarded a train for New York. A Coast Guardsman assigned to watch the beach noticed the suspicious strangers on the beach and notified the police and the FBI. 

In the spring of 2007 the original Coast Guard station, which had been moved to a private residence in 1966 to protect it from demolition, was moved back to near its original location at Atlantic Avenue beach. The Coast Guard barracks are now part of the East Hampton Town Marine Museum which includes exhibits from the town maritime history, including whaling relics and a cannon from the American Revolution ship HMS Culloden which ran aground at Montauk.

In 1998 President Bill Clinton, who was vacationing in East Hampton, gave a Saturday radio address from the Amagansett Fire House.

Amagansett includes a section of Further Lane, which is a block from the ocean, and has one of the biggest collections of mansions in East Hampton. In 2007, one of the estates sold for $107 million, the highest price for a private residential property.

As part of the settlement, several 18th and 19th century buildings which had been moved to the estate to prevent demolition were moved elsewhere in the town—including five that were moved to form a campus for the East Hampton town government.

"Amagansett", a pictorial history of the hamlet, was published in 1997 by Carleton Kelsey, longtime director of the Amagansett Free Library and former town clerk, and Lucinda Mayo, descendant of one of Amagansett's 17th century founders.

Many houses and other buildings still stand from the 19th and even 18th century in Amagansett, Montauk, the Hamptons and other Long Island communities.

Geography

At the end of the last ice age, Amagansett stood at the eastern tip of Long Island. At that time, Montauk was an island on its own in the Atlantic. In the intervening several thousand years, ocean currents, or littoral drift, filled in space with sand. This area is now known as Napeague.

Distinct places within Amagansett include Amagansett village, Beach Hampton, and the Devon Colony on Gardiner's Bay. Other places of geographic significance include the "Walking Dunes" in Napeague and the Atlantic Double Dunes, which are protected by The Nature Conservancy and local and federal governments.

Demographics

Demographics for the CDP
As of the census of 2000, there were 1,067 people, 493 households, and 281 families residing in the CDP. The population density was 169.6 per square mile (65.5/km2). There were 1,664 housing units at an average density of 264.5/sq mi (102.1/km2). The racial makeup of the CDP was 96.44% White, 1.69% African American, 0.28% Native American, 0.37% Asian, 0.28% from other races, and 0.94% from two or more races. Hispanic or Latino of any race were 4.03% of the population.

There were 493 households, out of which 21.1% had children under the age of 18 living with them, 48.1% were married couples living together, 6.5% had a female householder with no husband present, and 43.0% were non-families. 34.9% of all households were made up of individuals, and 15.6% had someone living alone who was 65 years of age or older. The average household size was 2.16 and the average family size was 2.78.

In the CDP, the population was spread out, with 19.1% under the age of 18, 3.2% from 18 to 24, 22.3% from 25 to 44, 33.0% from 45 to 64, and 22.4% who were 65 years of age or older. The median age was 48 years. For every 100 females, there were 102.9 males. For every 100 females age 18 and over, there were 94.8 males.

The median income for a household in the CDP was $56,406, and the median income for a family was $69,306. Males had a median income of $48,750 versus $36,500 for females. The per capita income for the CDP was $45,545. About 2.4% of families and 5.3% of the population were below the poverty line, including 4.7% of those under age 18 and 4.9% of those age 65 or over.

Transportation 
Amagansett is served by Amagansett station on the Montauk Branch of the Long Island Rail Road.

Education
The Amagansett Union Free School District operates the Amagansett School, serving grades PK through 6. Students then attend East Hampton schools for grades 7 to 12.

Notable people
A popular resort location, many famous people have resided in or owned second homes in Amagansett through the years, including Paul McCartney, Scarlett Johansson, Kathleen Turner, James Frey, Billy Joel, Jerry Seinfeld, Harvey Weinstein, Christie Brinkley, Diane Sawyer, Gwyneth Paltrow and Chris Martin, Liev Schreiber and Naomi Watts, Alec Baldwin, Sarah Jessica Parker and Matthew Broderick, Peter Mayle, Jann Wenner, Suzanne Vega, Howard Stern, Lorne Michaels, Bill Clinton and Hillary Clinton, Shane McMahon, Randy Lerner, Andy Cohen, Babs Simpson, and Mitch Kupchak.

Marilyn Monroe and Arthur Miller spent a summer there in the late 1950s. Perhaps the first wave of "summer people" was the "Devon Colony", which was founded in the late 19th century by executives of the Procter & Gamble company. Performance artist Laurie Anderson and her husband Lou Reed divided their time between their Greenwich Village apartment and a house in Amagansett, which Anderson called "our spiritual home." Reed died there in 2013.  Alfred Conkling was born in Amagansett.

References
Notes

External links

Amagansett Historic Sites and East Hampton Village Historic District East Hampton Chamber of Commerce

East Hampton (town), New York
Census-designated places in New York (state)
Hamlets in New York (state)
Populated places established in 1680
Census-designated places in Suffolk County, New York
1680 establishments in the Province of New York
Hamlets in Suffolk County, New York
Populated coastal places in New York (state)